Babel fish may refer to:

 Babel fish, a fictional species of fish invented by Douglas Adams in 1978; see The Hitchhiker's Guide to the Galaxy
 Babel Fish (band), a Norwegian band
 Yahoo! Babel Fish, a former web translation service

See also
 Babel Fishh, stage name of hip hop artist Scott Huber
 Barbel (fish)